The Alice James Award, formerly the Beatrice Hawley Award, is given annually by Alice James Books. The award includes publication of a book-length poetry manuscript and a cash prize (currently $2,000).

The award was established by the press in 1986 to honor cooperative member author Beatrice Hawley (Making the House Fall Down, 1977) who died in 1985 at forty-one years of age from lung cancer. The Award was renamed, like its sponsoring publisher, after Alice James "whose extraordinary gift for writing went unrecognized in her lifetime." The Award is a nationally-offered publication prize open to poets at any stage of their careers.

The first award recipient was Linnea Johnson, for The Chicago Home. Winners of the award have often gone on to receive national attention and further honors for their winning works, most notably, Brian Turner for Here, Bullet, which received national and international media attention. Turner also received numerous further awards and honors for his work, including a 2006 Lannan Literary Fellowship, the 2006 Northern California Book Award in Poetry, the 2006 PEN Center USA "Best in the West" Literary Award in Poetry, a 2007 NEA Literature Fellowship in Poetry, the 2007 Poets' Prize, and the 2009 Amy Lowell Poetry Traveling Scholarship.

Catherine Barnett (Into Perfect Spheres Such Holes Are Pierced, 2003) was further recognized with the 2004 Glasgow Prize for Emerging Writers, a Whiting Award, and a Guggenheim Fellowship. Mary Szybist (Granted, 2003) was further recognized with the 2004 Great Lakes Colleges Association New Writers Award, and was a 2003 National Book Critics Circle Award Finalist. B.H. Fairchild (The Art of the Lathe, 1997) was 1998 National Book Award Finalist, and won the 1999 William Carlos Williams Award, the 1999 PEN Center West Poetry Award, the 1999 Kingsley Tufts Poetry Award, and the 1999 California Book Award.

The 2008 winner, Slamming Open the Door, by Kathleen Sheeder Bonanno, was reviewed by The New York Times Sunday Book Review, and Bonanno was interviewed on NPR's Fresh Air by Terri Gross.

Beatrice Hawley / Alice James Award Winners

 1986: Linnea Johnson, for The Chicago Home
 1987: Laurel Trivelpiece, for Blue Holes
 1988: Jean Valentine, for Home Deep Blue
 1992: Alice Jones, for The Knot
 1994: Richard McCann, for Ghost Letters
 1995: Forrest Hamer, for Call & Response
 1996: Cynthia Huntington, for We Have Gone to the Beach
 1997: B.H. Fairchild, for The Art of the Lathe
 1998: Laura Kasischke, for Fire and Flower
 1999: Amy Newman, for Camera Lyrica
 2000: Claudia Keelan, for Utopic
 2001: Liz Waldner, for Self and Simulacra
 2002: Mary Szybist, for Granted
 2003: Catherine Barnett, for Into Perfect Spheres Such Holes Are Pierced
 2004: Dobby Gibson, for Polar
 2005: Brian Turner, for Here, Bullet
 2006: Henrietta Goodman, for Take What You Want
 2007: Lia Purpura, for King Baby
 2008: Kathleen Sheeder Bonanno for Slamming Open the Door
 2009: Reginald Dwayne Betts, for Shahid Reads His Own Palm
 2010: Lesle Lewis, for lie down too
 2011: Jane Springer, for Murder Ballad
 2012: Jamaal May for Hum
 2013: Philip Metres for Sand Opera
 2014: Richie Hofmann for Second Empire
 2015: Elizabeth Lyons for The Blessing of Dark Water
 2016: Anna Rose Welch for Noah's Woods
 2017: Mia Malhotra for When I See You Again It Will Be With a Different Face
 2018: Amy Woolard for Neck of the Woods
 2019: Rosebud Ben-Oni for If This is the Age We End Discovery
 2020: Aldo Amparán for Brother Sleep
 2021: Ina Cariño for Feast

References

Sources 
 Alice James Books Website > Various Pages

Awards established in 1986
American poetry awards
1986 establishments in Maine